Three Tuns is the name of:

 Three Tuns Brewery, in Bishop's Castle, Shropshire
 Three Tuns, Pennsylvania, a community in the United States
 Three Tuns, Uxbridge, a pub in London
 Three Tuns, Alcester, a pub in Warwickshire
 The Three Tuns, a pub in York